John Solomon "Sap" Davis (October 21, 1898 – February 16, 1985) was an American football and basketball coach and college athletics administrator. He was the 12th head football coach at Ottawa University in Ottawa, Kansas, serving for the 1930 season and compiling a record of 1–6. Davis was also the athletic director and head basketball coach at Ottawa from 1927 to 1931. He moved to the State Normal School of Colorado—now known as the University of Northern Colorado—in 1931 to replace George E. Cooper as head basketball coach. In 1937, Davis was hired as the head basketball coach at Colorado State College of Agriculture and Mechanic Arts—now known as Colorado State University.

Head coaching record

Football

References

External links
 

1898 births
1985 deaths
Colorado State Rams men's basketball coaches
Northern Colorado Bears men's basketball coaches
Ottawa Braves athletic directors
Ottawa Braves basketball coaches
Ottawa Braves football coaches
Ottawa University alumni
Coaches of American football from Kansas
People from Franklin County, Kansas
Basketball coaches from Kansas